Elisabeth Trissenaar (born 13 April 1944) is an Austrian actress, who lives in Berlin.

Life and career 
Trissenaar's father was the Dutchman Frans Trijssenaar. After studying at the Max-Reinhardt-Seminar in Vienna, she was cast in her first role at the Bern Theatre in 1964. Between 1972 and 1981, she had great success at the Schauspiel Frankfurt, especially in the roles of Nora Helmer in A Doll's House and in the title role of Hedda Gabler (both plays by Ibsen), as well as Medea by Euripides.

During this time Trissenaar began her collaboration with Rainer Werner Fassbinder, under his direction she was in works such as The Stationmaster's Wife (Bolwieser, 1977), In a Year of 13 Moons (1978), The Marriage of Maria Braun (1979), and in the television series of Alfred Döblin's Berlin Alexanderplatz (1980).

She was married to the director Hans Neuenfels until his death in 2022; they have a son, the film director Benedict Neuenfels.

Awards 
 1981: German critics' award (Deutscher Kritikerpreis)

Selected filmography
Miss Julie (1971, TV film, based on the play Miss Julie), as Miss Julie
A Doll's House (1973, TV film, based on the play A Doll's House), as Nora Helmer
Hedda Gabler (1974, TV film, based on the play Hedda Gabler), as Hedda Gabler
Dorothea Merz (1976, TV film, based on a novel by Tankred Dorst), as Bella Schedewy
Und Rosa und Marilyn und ... (1977, TV film, based on the play Étoiles rouges by Pierre Bourgeade), as Marilyn
The Stationmaster's Wife (1977 TV film and 1983 theatrical release, based on a novel by Oskar Maria Graf), as Hanni Bolwieser
Das Ende einer Karriere (1978, TV film), as Karla
 (1978, TV film), as Ellen
In a Year of 13 Moons (1978), as Irene Weishaupt
When Hitler Stole Pink Rabbit (1978, TV film, based on the novel When Hitler Stole Pink Rabbit), as Anna's Mother
The Marriage of Maria Braun (1979), as Betti
 (1980), as Lisa
Das Käthchen von Heilbronn (1980, TV film, based on the play Das Käthchen von Heilbronn), as Kunigunde von Thurneck
Berlin Alexanderplatz (1980, TV miniseries, based on the novel Berlin Alexanderplatz), as Lina Przybilla
Charlotte (1981), as Paulinka
Heinrich Penthesilea von Kleist (1983, based on the play Penthesilea), as Penthesilea
A Love in Germany (1983, based on a novel by Rolf Hochhuth), as Elsbeth Schnittgens
 (1984, TV film, based on the novel Bluebeard), as Andrea
Angry Harvest (1985, based on a novel by Hermann Field and Stanislaw Mierzenski), as Rosa Eckart
Franza (1987, TV film, based on a novel by Ingeborg Bachmann), as Franza
The Winner Takes All (1987, TV film, based on a novel by ), as Elisabeth Vogtmann
 (1987, TV film), as Alma Mahler
Mario and the Magician (1994, based on the novella Mario and the Magician), as Sofronia Angiolieri
 (1994), as Madeleine
Der Hauptmann von Köpenick (1997, TV film, based on the play The Captain of Köpenick), as Mathilde Obermüller
 (1998, TV film), as Renate
Cold Is the Evening Breeze (2000, based on a novel by Ingrid Noll), as Charlotte's Mother
SOKO Kitzbühel - Der Ring der Toten (2004, TV series based on a book by Martin Ambrosch), as Sofia von Schöll
 (2005, TV film), as Ingrid, Catherine's Mother
I've Never Been Happier (2009), as Fritzi

External links 
 Trissenaar's Agent
 Her page at the Deutsche Filmakademie
 
 Audio recordings with Elisabeth Trissenaar in the Online Archive of the Österreichische Mediathek (Interviews in German). Retrieved 2 September 2019

1944 births
Austrian film actresses
Austrian stage actresses
Austrian television actresses
20th-century Austrian actresses
21st-century Austrian actresses
German film actresses
German stage actresses
German television actresses
20th-century German actresses
21st-century German actresses
Living people
Actresses from Berlin
Actresses from Vienna